Infoshops are places in which people can access anarchist or autonomist ideas. They are often stand-alone projects, or can form part of a larger radical bookshop, archive, self-managed social centre or community centre. Typically, infoshops offer flyers, posters, zines, pamphlets and books for sale or donation. Other items such as badges, locally produced artworks and T-shirts are also often available. Infoshops can also provide printing and copying facilities for people to produce their own literature or have a meeting space.

Infoshops can be found in many cities in North America and Western Europe, and also in other locations around the world such as Australia, Israel and New Zealand. They are self-managed spaces run by volunteers which vary in size and function, depending on local context.

Radical spaces

An infoshop (the word being a portmanteau of information and shop) is a physical space where people can access radical ideas through flyers, posters, zines, pamphlets and books. It also provides a space to meet other people and in some cases to organise events such as meetings or fundraisers. Some infoshops have computers, copy machines and printers so that pamphlets, position papers, articles, magazines, and newspapers can be created and then circulated between the network of spaces.

Academic Chris Atton describes the infoshop as a "forum for alternative cultural, economic, political and social activities." For example, in a flyer announcing its planned activities, the Autonomous Centre of Edinburgh (ACE) stated it would make available locally produced arts and crafts, records, T-shirts, badges, books, zines and information. When it opened the following year, ACE provided flyers, leaflets, newsletters, magazines and journals about causes such as antivivisectionism, anti-monarchism, hunt sabotage and jobseeker's allowance advice.

Like social centres, infoshops vary in size and function depending on local context. Many contemporary anarchists first come into contact with radical politics through an infoshop.

Infoshops tend to be run on a voluntary basis by a non-hierarchical collective. The spaces are non-profit and self-managed.

Antecedents
In the United Kingdom, early antecedents of infoshops were the radical presses such as Giles Calvert's printshop (1600s) and John Doherty's coffee house (1830s). More recently, infoshops were associated with squatted anarchist social centres such as the 121 Centre in Brixton, London and the Free Information Network (FIN).

Writing in Maximumrocknroll in the 1990s, Chuck Munson placed North American infoshops in the lineage of peace and justice community centres and acknowledged the influence of European social centres. Munson also stated there were over 60 infoshops (infoladen) in Germany which were connected to the anarchist, autonomist, squatting and punk movements.

Around the world

Self-managed social centres in Italy, such as Forte Prenestino in Rome, often contain infoshops.

Social centres in the United Kingdom often contain infoshops, such as for example the Cowley Club in Brighton and the 1 in 12 Club in Bradford. There is also the 56a Infoshop in London. In the mid 2000s, as well as these spaces, there were infoshops in Leeds, Manchester, Norwich and Nottingham.

In the 1990s, there were the following infoshops in North America: 223 Center (Portland, Oregon); 404 Willis (Detroit); A-Space (Philadelphia); Arise! Bookstore & Resource Center (Minneapolis); Autonomous Zone (Chicago); Beehive Infoshop (Washington DC); Blackout Books (New York City); Crescent Wrench Infoshop (New Orleans);  Croatan (Baltimore); Emma Center (Minneapolis); Epicenter (San Francisco); Long Haul (Berkeley); Lucy Parsons Center (Cambridge); Mayday Books (Minneapolis); Who's Emma (Toronto); Wooden Shoe Books (Philadelphia).

Elsewhere in the world, projects include Jura Books in Australia, Salon Mazal in Israel and Freedom Shop in New Zealand.

Related projects include anarchist archives, bunkos in Japan and community libraries.

Notable infoshops

See also

Arts centre
Anarchist bookfair
Cultural centre
CrimethInc.
:Category:Infoshops, notable infoshops
Zine library

References

External links
 Slingshot contact list (updated 2019).
 Radar directory of infoshops (updated 2019).
 Directory of infoshops (last updated 1997).
 Infoshops in North America (last updated 2015).
 Infoshops by region (archived 2015).
 Living Room Documentary – A documentary film about infoshop culture (2006).
 The A-Zone & A Decade Of Anarchy In Chicago – A zine about the Autonomous Zone in Chicago (re-released 2015).

Anarchist movements
DIY culture
 
Squatting